Roger Watson may refer to:

 Roger Watson (cricketer) (born 1964), English cricketer
 Roger Watson (academic) (born 1955), British nurse academic